Tayshia Adams (born September 4, 1990) is an American television personality. She received national recognition after appearing as a contestant on season 23 of The Bachelor and the sixth season of Bachelor in Paradise. On November 5, 2020, Adams replaced Clare Crawley as the Bachelorette on season 16 of The Bachelorette. Adams co-hosted The Bachelorette season 17 and 18.

Early life and education 
Adams was raised in Newport Beach, California by her parents Rosario and Desmond Adams. Her father is African-American and her mother is Mexican; Adams identifies as bi-racial. She has three siblings and was a Girl Scout for 12 years. Adams attended Concordia University Irvine and graduated in 2012 with a bachelor's degree in biology. During her first week of college in 2008, she was run over by a truck, saying: "I had to relearn how to walk in the hospital and missed about two and a half, three months of school. After about two years, I finally got to the point where I could walk 'normally' and not have chronic pain when I sat down." In 2011, Adams was hit by a distracted driver on the highway and she suffered from chronic pain for five years after the accident. Adams credits physical therapy for her recovery.

In addition to being a reality television personality, Adams is also a former phlebotomist.

Career 
Adams has gained a large social media following on Instagram. Adams is an influencer and has shared messages and advertisements on social media for various companies such as car manufacturer Hyundai, deodorant brand Secret and hair care brand Conair. She is an ambassador for several brands, including Maybelline and Fabletics.

Fashion and beauty 
In October 2021, Adams launched a clothing collection with Amaryllis Apparel called "Amaryllis x Tayshia". The collection consists of 17 pieces, including tops, skirts, jackets, jeans and blouses. The collection was designed for "the girl on the go" and was priced between $39.99 and $149.99. On March 8, 2022, she announced her partnership with athletics brand Asics. In September 2022, Adams teamed up with Conair and Scünci and created a collection of hair accessories and tools sold at Walmart. The collection called "Tayshia by Conair", consists of 33 hair accessories, five hair brushes and combs, five hair tools and one mirror.

Adams has graced the covers of numerous luxury lifestyle and fashion magazines such as Modeliste and Locale. She has also appeared in pictorials for Cosmopolitan, Marie Claire and Women's Health.

Television 
Adams was a guest co-host on E! Daily Pop from March 24 to March 30, 2022. Adams hosted the MTV Movie & TV Awards: Unscripted award show on June 5, 2022. On July 31, 2022, she competed against Matt James on game show The $100,000 Pyramid.

The Bachelor, Bachelor in Paradise and The Bachelorette 
Adams made her debut in The Bachelor franchise in 2019 when she appeared on Colton Underwood's season of The Bachelor. Adams was one of the final two contestants, alongside Hannah Godwin, both of whom were eliminated when Underwood decided to end the show to pursue Cassie Randolph.

After her elimination from The Bachelor, Adams appeared on season six of Bachelor in Paradise in August 2019, where she started dating fellow contestant John Paul Jones. The two split in September 2019, prior to the show's finale. After the finale, Adams and Jones rekindled their relationship when she traveled to Saint Michaels, Maryland, to "see if he would be willing to give their relationship another chance." They dated for a few weeks before ending their relationship again in late October 2019.

In 2020, Adams was chosen as the replacement for Clare Crawley on season 16 of The Bachelorette after Crawley's exit, making this the first American Bachelorette season to have its lead replaced. In the season finale, Adams chose Zac Clark, an addiction specialist from New Jersey, over runner-up Ben Smith, and the couple became engaged to marry.

On March 13, 2021, it was announced that Adams will co-host season 17 of The Bachelorette alongside fellow former Bachelorette Kaitlyn Bristowe. On May 17, 2021,  Adams accepted the award for "Best Dating Show" on The Bachelorette's behalf at the MTV Movie & TV Awards: Unscripted ceremony. In June 2021, Marie Claire called her "a longtime Bachelor Nation fan favorite." In 2021, Adams hosted two podcasts, Bachelor Happy Hour and Click Bait with Bachelor Nation. After a successful run co-hosting The Bachelorette Season 17, "Adams and Bristowe have received a warm reception as co-hosts, garnering positive feedback from Bachelor Nation on social media," leading to Adams being announced as the co-host for The Bachelorette season 18 with a multi-year option to extend beyond the two seasons she has co-hosted of The Bachelorette franchise this far. In January 2022, Adams was replaced by Tia Booth as the co-host of Click Bait with Bachelor Nation podcast.

Personal life 
In 2015, Adams married Josh Bourelle; they divorced in 2017. In 2020, after meeting on The Bachelorette, she became engaged to Zac Clark. The couple broke up in November 2021.

Her interests include real estate, architecture and interior design.

Filmography

References

External links

1990 births
Living people
Bachelor Nation contestants
American exercise instructors
African-American Christians
21st-century African-American women
21st-century African-American people
People from Santa Ana, California
Entertainers from California
African-American television talk show hosts
American television talk show hosts
American television personalities of Mexican descent
American women television presenters
Concordia University Irvine
Girl Scouts of the USA people